Smebye is a surname. Notable people with the surname include:

Einar Henning Smebye (born 1950), Norwegian pianist and music teacher
Sigurd Smebye (1886–1954), Norwegian gymnast

See also
Smeby